Deceiver is the fourth solo album by American newgrass mandolinist Chris Thile, released on Sugar Hill in 2004. It features a total of 39 instruments, all played by Thile himself.  The instruments played on the album include the mandolin, mandola, bass guitar, electric guitar, piano, violin, banjo and various percussion instruments. In 2005, the album was nominated the Grammy Award for Best Engineered Album, Non-Classical to the album's engineers, Thile and Gary Paczosa.

Musical style
In a 2007 interview, Chris Thile discussed what he musically envisioned for Deceiver:

Track listing
All tracks composed by Chris Thile
"The Wrong Idea" - 2:37
"On Ice" - 3:52
"Locking Doors" - 2:44
"Waltz For Dewayne Pomeroy" - 3:03
"Empire Falls" - 2:58
"I'm Nowhere and You're Everything" - 5:54
"Jessamyn's Reel" - 1:54
"The Believer" - 2:35
"This Is All Real" - 3:27
"Ready For Anything" - 5:15

Personnel
Chris Thile - Music, Arranger, Producer, Art Direction, Design 
Gary Paczosa - Producer, Engineer 
Wendy Stamberger - Art Direction

References

2004 albums
Chris Thile albums
Sugar Hill Records albums